This is a list of flag bearers who have represented Honduras at the Olympics.

Flag bearers carry the national flag of their country at the opening ceremony of the Olympic Games.

See also
Honduras at the Olympics

References

Honduras at the Olympics
Honduras
Olympic flagbearers
Olympic flagbearers